The 2010 ICF World Junior Canoe Slalom Championships were the 13th edition of the ICF World Junior Canoe Slalom Championships. The event took place in Foix, France from 8 to 11 July 2010 under the auspices of the International Canoe Federation (ICF).

The women's C1 event debuted at these championships. There was no team event for this new category.

Medal summary

Men

Canoe

Kayak

Women

Canoe

Kayak

Medal table

References

External links
International Canoe Federation

ICF World Junior Canoe Slalom Championships
ICF World Junior and U23 Canoe Slalom Championships